{{DISPLAYTITLE:Aflatoxin B1 exo-8,9-epoxide}}

Aflatoxin B1 exo-8,9-epoxide is a toxic metabolite of aflatoxin B1. It's formed by the action of cytochrome P450 enzymes in the liver.

In the liver, aflatoxin B1 is metabolized to aflatoxin B1 exo-8,9-epoxide by the cytochrome P450 enzymes. The resulting epoxide can react with guanine in the DNA to cause DNA damage.

See also
Aflatoxin B1
Cytochrome P450

References

Epoxides
Aflatoxins
Human metabolites